Samuel Glenn Fuqua (October 15, 1899 – January 27, 1987) was a United States Navy rear admiral and a recipient of America's highest military decoration—the Medal of Honor—for his actions in World War II during the attack on Pearl Harbor.

Biography
Samuel was born October 15, 1899, a native of Laddonia, Missouri and entered the United States Naval Academy in July 1919, after a year at the University of Missouri and World War I service in the Army. Following graduation and commissioning in June 1923, he served in the battleship , destroyer  and battleship  before receiving shore duty at San Francisco, California, from 1930 to 1932. Lieutenant Fuqua served in other ships and shore stations during the mid-1930s, and was commanding officer of the minesweeper  in the Asiatic Fleet in 1937–39.

After service at the Naval Training Station, Great Lakes, Illinois, from 1939 to 1941, Lieutenant Commander Fuqua returned to Arizona as the ship's Damage Control Officer and first lieutenant, and was on board her during Japan's December 7, 1941, attack on Pearl Harbor. Though knocked unconscious by a bomb that hit the ship's stern early in the attack, he subsequently directed fire fighting and rescue efforts. After the ship's forward magazines exploded, he was her senior surviving officer and was responsible for saving her remaining crewmen. For his actions at that time, he was awarded the Medal of Honor.

During most of 1942, Fuqua was an officer of the cruiser  and was promoted to commander. From 1943 to 1944, he was assigned to duty at Guantanamo Bay, Cuba, later attended the Naval War College, and was promoted to the rank of captain.

Captain Fuqua was Operations Officer for Commander Seventh Fleet from January to August 1945, helping to plan and execute several amphibious operations in the Philippines and Borneo area. Following the war, he served in other staff positions, and from 1949 to 1950 commanded the destroyer tender . After service as Chief of Staff of the Eighth Naval District, he retired from active duty in July 1953, receiving at that time the rank of rear admiral on the basis of his combat awards.

He died January 27, 1987, in Decatur, Georgia, and was buried at Arlington National Cemetery, in Arlington, Virginia.

Awards
Medal of Honor
Legion of Merit with gold star
China Service Medal
American Defense Service Medal with "FLEET" clasp
American Campaign Medal
Asiatic-Pacific Campaign Medal with battle star
European-African-Middle Eastern Campaign Medal with 2 battle stars
World War II Victory Medal
Navy Occupation Medal with "ASIA" clasp
National Defense Service Medal

Medal of Honor citation
Lieutenant Commander Fuqua's official Medal of Honor citation reads:
For distinguished conduct in action, outstanding heroism, and utter disregard of his own safety, above and beyond the call of duty during the attack on the Fleet in Pearl Harbor, by Japanese forces on 7 December 1941. Upon the commencement of the attack, Lieutenant Commander Fuqua rushed to the quarterdeck of the U.S.S. Arizona to which he was attached where he was stunned and knocked down by the explosion of a large bomb which hit the quarterdeck, penetrated several decks, and started a severe fire. Upon regaining consciousness, he began to direct the fighting of the fire and the rescue of wounded and injured personnel. Almost immediately there was a tremendous explosion forward, which made the ship appear to rise out of the water, shudder and settle down by the bow rapidly. The whole forward part of the ship was enveloped in flames which were spreading rapidly, and wounded and burned men were pouring out of the ship to the quarterdeck. Despite these conditions, his harrowing experience, and severe enemy bombing and strafing, at the time, Lieutenant Commander Fuqua continued to direct the fighting of fires in order to check them while the wounded and burned could be taken from the ship, and supervised the rescue of these men in such an amazingly calm and cool manner and with such excellent judgement, that it inspired everyone who saw him and undoubtedly resulted in the saving of many lives. After realizing that the ship could not be saved and that he was the senior surviving officer aboard, he directed that it be abandoned, but continued to remain on the quarterdeck and directed abandoning ship and rescue of personnel until satisfied that all personnel that could be had been saved, after which he left the ship with the (last) boatload. The conduct of Lieutenant Commander Fuqua was not only in keeping with the highest traditions of the Naval Service but characterizes him as an outstanding leader of men.

See also

 List of Medal of Honor recipients for World War II

Notes

References

External links
 

1899 births
1987 deaths
World War II recipients of the Medal of Honor
United States Navy Medal of Honor recipients
United States Navy rear admirals (upper half)
United States Naval Academy alumni
United States Army personnel of World War I
United States Navy personnel of World War II
United States Navy personnel of the Korean War
Burials at Arlington National Cemetery
People from Audrain County, Missouri
University of Missouri alumni
Attack on Pearl Harbor
United States Army soldiers